Epidendrum subg. Amphiglottium (Salisb.) Lindl. 1841 is a subgenus of reed-stemmed Epidendrums, distinguished by an apical inflorescence with the peduncle covered from its base with close imbricating sheaths and by a lip that is adnate to the column to its apex.

Reichenbach published three sections in this subgenus:
 E. sect. Polycladia with truly paniculate inflorescences
 E. sect. Holochila with racemose inflorescences and an undivided lip
 E. sect. Schistochila with racemose inflorescences and a lobate lip

References

 
Orchid subgenera